Majidreza Ehteshamzadeh (born 14 December 1956) is an Iranian table tennis player. He participated in the 2000 Summer Olympics.

References

External links
 Majidreza Ehteshamzadeh sports-reference.com

1956 births
Table tennis players at the 2000 Summer Olympics
Living people
Iranian male table tennis players
Olympic table tennis players of Iran